Toab is the southernmost village on Mainland, Shetland, Scotland. It is part of Virkie and overlooks Sumburgh Airport. Toab is within the parish of Dunrossness.

The name Toab may come from the old Norse hópr or hóp meaning a small landlocked bay or lagoon.

References

External links

Canmore - Broch of Toab site record
Canmore - Toab, Maybury site record

Villages in Mainland, Shetland